is a waterfall on the upper reaches of Kari river, in western Minamiashigara, Kanagawa, Japan.

Yūhi can be translated as "sunset", and is so named because of its beauty in the setting sun.

Waterfalls of Japan
Landforms of Kanagawa Prefecture
Tourist attractions in Kanagawa Prefecture